The women's 5000 metres at the 2002 European Athletics Championships were held at the Olympic Stadium on August 10.

Results

External links

5000
5000 metres at the European Athletics Championships
2002 in women's athletics